Claude Randolph Taylor was an American football and basketball coach.  He served as the head football coach at Johnson C. Smith University in Charlotte, North Carolina, Tillotson College—now a part of Huston–Tillotson University—in Austin, Texas, Bluefield State College in Bluefield, West Virginia, and Kentucky State College for Negroes—now known as Kentucky State University—in Frankfort, Kentucky.  Taylor was also the head basketball coach at Johnson C. Smith for one season, in 1928–29, tallying a mark of 6–11.

Early life and college
Taylor was a native of Harlem in New York City.  He attended DeWitt Clinton High School, where starred in football and track.  He then matriculated at Tufts College—now known as Tufts University—where he played football and basketball and ran track, before graduating in 1927 with a Bachelor of Science degree.  As a senior, he was named the school's best all-around athlete.

Coaching career
Taylor was the tenth head football coach at Kentucky State University in Frankfort, Kentucky, serving four seasons, from 1947 to 1950, and compiling a record of 21–17–2.

Head coaching record

Football

References

Year of birth missing
Year of death missing
20th-century African-American sportspeople
African-American basketball players
African-American coaches of American football
African-American male track and field athletes
African-American players of American football
Basketball coaches from New York (state)
Basketball players from New York City
Bluefield State Big Blues football coaches
Coaches of American football from New York (state)
College men's track and field athletes in the United States
DeWitt Clinton High School alumni
Johnson C. Smith Golden Bulls basketball coaches
Johnson C. Smith Golden Bulls football coaches
Kentucky State Thorobreds football coaches
People from Harlem
Players of American football from New York (state)
Sportspeople from Manhattan
Tufts Jumbos football players
Tufts Jumbos men's basketball players
Track and field athletes from New York City